Saturnine can refer to:

Relating to Saturn
Saturnine antshrike, species of bird
The Saturnine, music group 
Saturnine Martial & Lunatic, a 1996 compilation album by Tears for Fears

See also
Saturnin
Saturnina, Christian martyr 
Saturnino (disambiguation)
Saturninus (disambiguation)
Saint-Saturnin (disambiguation)
Saint Saturninus (disambiguation)